Teichosporella is a genus of fungi in the class Dothideomycetes. The relationship of this taxon to other taxa within the class is unknown (incertae sedis). The genus was first described by Italian mycologist Pier Andrea Saccardo in 1895.

Species
T. acolioides
T. africae
T. arthonioides
T. azaleae
T. callimorpha
T. cervariensis
T. crebriseptata
T. denudata
T. dura
T. edwiniae
T. indica
T. lantanae
T. lonicerina
T. montana
T. negeriana
T. obliqua
T. oryzae
T. pachyasca
T. patellaris
T. phellogena
T. planiuscula
T. rauzabagensis
T. rostrata
T. sanguinea
T. subrostrata
T. ziziphi

See also
 List of Dothideomycetes genera incertae sedis

References

Dothideomycetes enigmatic taxa
Dothideomycetes genera